Khuda Jassu is a village in the Chandigarh district, in the Union Territory of Chandigarh, India.

References

Villages in Chandigarh district